Leroy Holt (born March 16, 1967) is a former American football fullback from the University of Southern California (USC).

High school years
Holt attended Banning High School in Wilmington, California. He was a three-year letterman in football where he was starting fullback behind teammate Jamelle Holieway and ran through holes created by teammate Courtney Hall. He was named the California High School fullback of the Year as a senior.

College career
Holt was the first USC fullback to start all four years. He broke Sam Cunningham's all-time records for rushing yards and carries without a fumble.

Professional career
Holt was drafted with the 137th pick of the 1990 NFL Draft by the Miami Dolphins. His career was shortened when he fractured a vertebra in his neck during the preseason in practice.

References

1966 births
Living people
People from Carson, California
American football fullbacks
USC Trojans football players
Players of American football from California
Sportspeople from Los Angeles County, California